Dwight Freeman (born June 29, 1959) is an American former basketball player and coach. He was previously the head coach at Marshall and Norfolk State. At Marshall, he was the first black head basketball coach in Southern Conference history.

Head coaching record

References

External links
Miami bio

1959 births
Living people
African-American basketball players
American men's basketball players
Basketball coaches from Washington, D.C.
Basketball players from Washington, D.C.
Colgate Raiders men's basketball coaches
Delaware State Hornets men's basketball coaches
Hutchinson Blue Dragons men's basketball coaches
James Madison Dukes men's basketball coaches
Marshall Thundering Herd men's basketball coaches
Miami Hurricanes men's basketball coaches
Moberly Greyhounds men's basketball coaches
Norfolk State Spartans men's basketball coaches
SMU Mustangs men's basketball players
Western Colorado Mountaineers men's basketball players
21st-century African-American people
20th-century African-American sportspeople